Corey Sanders has served as Chief Operating Officer of MGM Resorts International since June 2010. He oversees operations at the Company’s wholly owned properties, which in Nevada include Bellagio (resort), MGM Grand Las Vegas, Mandalay Bay, The Mirage, New York-New York Hotel and Casino, Monte Carlo Resort and Casino, Luxor Las Vegas, Excalibur Hotel and Casino, Circus Circus Las Vegas, Circus Circus Reno, Gold Strike Jean and Railroad Pass Casino. He also oversees Beau Rivage (Mississippi) in Biloxi and Gold Strike Tunica, both in Mississippi, as well as MGM Grand Detroit.

Career History
Mr. Sanders previously served as the Chief Operating Officer for the Company’s Core Brand and Regional Properties. In his two decades with the company, he also served as corporate Executive Vice President of Operations, developing both growth opportunities and operating efficiencies for the company. He has held the positions of corporate Executive Vice President and CFO of MGM Grand Resorts, and Executive Vice President and CFO of MGM Grand Las Vegas.

He began his career as a tax specialist at Arthur Andersen and came to MGM Grand as tax director in the corporate office in 1994. Within three years, he became CFO of MGM Grand, and his role grew as the company expanded.

Community and Industry Involvement
He is a trustee of the UNLV Foundation and a member of the Board of Directors of the Nevada Resort Association.

Education
He earned a Bachelor of Arts degree in Economics from University of California, Los Angeles.

References

Living people
University of California, Los Angeles alumni
University of Nevada, Las Vegas people
American hoteliers
Year of birth missing (living people)
Place of birth missing (living people)
American chief financial officers
American chief operating officers